Leptocharacidium omospilus is a species of fish in the family Crenuchidae (South American darters). It is endemic to Venezuela where it is found in the upper Orinoco River system.  It is the only member of its genus.

References

Crenuchidae

Fish of South America
Fish described in 1993